The László Papp Budapest Sports Arena, also known as Budapest Sports Arena or locally just Arena, is a multi-purpose indoor arena in Budapest, Hungary. It is the second biggest sports complex in the country after MVM Dome, which is also in the capital, and it is named after Hungarian boxer László Papp. The venue can hold up to 12,500 people in its largest concert configuration, up to 11,390 for boxing and 9,479 for ice hockey. It was built as a replacement for the Budapest Sports Hall (or BS for short) which stood in the same place and was destroyed in a fire in December 1999. A long distance bus station is situated under the building.

History

Construction of the arena began on 30 June 2001, after the original Budapest Sportcsarnok, built in 1982, burnt to the ground on 15 December 1999. The sports hall was finished within a year and a half and the opening ceremony was held on 13 March 2003. Since 28 May 2004, the arena wears the name of Hungarian boxing great László Papp and is officially known as Papp László Budapest Sports Arena.

The building has a total weight of 200,000 tons and contains 50,000 tons of concrete, 2,300 tons of steel structure, more than 11,000,000 bolts and several kilometres of cable.

The state-of-the-art multifunctional plaza is capable to host almost all sort of sport events such as ball games, gymnastics competitions, ice hockey matches and athletics events, moreover spectacular and extreme sports events like motocross, jet-skiing or surfing competitions. The arena also has a leading role in the entertainment business with regularly welcoming the greatest international stars of the music industry, as well as dance shows, operas, dramas, circus arts, musicals and a variety of other special events.

Sporting events
The first major international event held in the arena was the 2003 IIHF World Championship Division I, in which the hosts finished third. Next year the 2004 IAAF World Indoor Championships was organized in the hall between 5 and 7 March, followed by the final rounds and placement matches of the 2004 European Women's Handball Championship in December. A year later, Budapest Sports Arena hosted the 2005 World Wrestling Championships.

In 2007, the Hungarian Ice Hockey Federation celebrated its 80th anniversary with a friendly match against defending Olympic and World champions Sweden, played at the arena. In a closely fought battle, Hungary finally triumphed 2–1 in overtime against the Scandinavians to the delight of their 8,000 fans.

Starting from 2008, every year in the Budapest Sports Arena takes place the Tennis Classics, an exhibition tennis tournament with participation of former and current tennis aces. During the years, Budapest welcomed players like Stefan Edberg, Mats Wilander, Ivan Lendl or Thomas Muster and reigning stars, such as Robin Söderling and Tomáš Berdych. In addition, beside the Főnix Hall in Debrecen, Budapest Sports Arena was the other host venue of the 2010 UEFA Futsal Championship.

Between 17 and 23 April 2011, the arena was the home of the 2011 IIHF World Championship Division I. The event enjoyed particular attention by the fans throughout the week and the number of 8700 spectators that attended on the decisive last-round match between Hungary and Italy is close to equal to the figures produced by the top division World Championship final, held a week later in Bratislava, Slovakia.

Following the decision of the European Handball Federation Executive Committee, the organization rights of the 2014 European Women's Handball Championship were awarded to Croatia and Hungary. Budapest Sports Arena was set to host the conclusive stage of the tournament, including the semifinals, the bronze medal match and final.

The Final Four of the Women's EHF Champions League has been annually taking place in the arena since 2014.

The 2017 World Judo Championships was also held in the Arena.

At the 2022 European Men's Handball Championship and for the next main handball events in Hungary, the arena is replaced by the New Budapest Arena.

Fire system
The building is protected by several fire safety systems. One of these is the protection alarm system, which in the event of a fire gives off the alarm within three seconds. The Budapest Sports Arena is also equipped with a fire hydrant system that, in the case of a catastrophe, can be used at more than sixty positions in the building. Every point of the arena can be reached with the help of the fire hoses. As a unique feature in Hungary, the building also contains three high-output water cannons. All three are positioned in the auditorium protecting the area that caused the destruction of the arena's predecessor. The Arena also has numerous fire doors that automatically lock in the case of a fire, so preventing the further spreading of a fire.

Entertainment events

References

External links

  
 Budapest Sports Arena on KÖZTI website
 Budapest Sports Arena on Sport Concepts website

Indoor arenas in Hungary
Indoor ice hockey venues in Hungary
Sports venues in Budapest
Indoor track and field venues
Basketball venues in Hungary
Handball venues in Hungary
Music venues in Hungary
Tennis venues in Hungary
Sports venues completed in 2003
2003 establishments in Hungary